SFB may refer to:

 Securities and Futures Bureau, an agency in Taiwan
 Sender Freies Berlin (Radio Free Berlin), a German broadcaster
 SfB-Oure FA, a Danish football club
 Small finance bank, a type of financial institution in India
 Sonderforschungsbereiche (Collaborative Research Centres), German research projects
 Star Fleet Battles, a board game
 Statens filmgranskningsbyrå, Finnish Board of Film Classification
 Stochastic Fair Blue, an active queue management algorithm
 Sunken featured building, or pit-house, a type of partially below-ground shelter
 N-succinimidyl 4-fluorobenzoate, an organofluorine compound
 Orlando Sanford International Airport (IATA code)